Alva is a coastal town and a locality in the Shire of Burdekin, Queensland, Australia.

Geography 
The northern part of Alva is a peninsula extending into the Coral Sea. The peninsula and north-western part of the locality are within the Bowling Green Bay National Park. 

Alva Beach, also known as Lynchs Beach, is part of the Burdekin River Delta.

History 
Alva was first surveyed as a town in 1926.

Amenities 
The town is home to the Ayr Surf Life Saving Club which opened in 1926 at Alva Beach, the Alva Beach Tourist Park, and a dive shop  offering trips to the SS Yongala ship wreck.

Gallery

References

External links 
 Town map of Alva, 1974

Towns in Queensland
Shire of Burdekin
Coastline of Queensland
Localities in Queensland